The 1972 River Oaks Tennis Tournament – Singles was an event of the 1972 River Oaks Tennis Tournament men's tennis tournament and was held at the River Oaks Country Club in Houston, Texas in the United States from April 3 through April 9, 1972. Cliff Richey was the defending champion but did not compete in this edition. First-seeded Rod Laver won the singles title, defeating second-seeded Ken Rosewall in the final, 6–2, 6–4.

Seeds

Draw

Finals

Top half

Bottom half

See also
 Laver–Rosewall rivalry

References

External links
 ITF tournament edition details

Tennis in Texas
1972 World Championship Tennis circuit
Louisville Open
1972 in American tennis